Eshel may refer to:

Organizations
 Eshel (organization), Orthodox LGBTQ support organization

Places
Israel
 Eshel HaNasi, Israel
 Beit Eshel, Mandatory Palestine

United States
 Eshel, California

People with the surname
 Hanan Eshel
 Tamar Eshel (1920–2022), Israeli diplomat and politician